TicketNetwork is an online marketplace that provides an outlet for buyers and sellers of tickets to live entertainment events. The company was founded in 2002 by ticket broker Don Vaccaro and software developer Doug Kruse. It operates several retail sites and partners with large name brand travel and media companies.

In 2015, TicketNetwork signed an exclusive agreement with ATBS to provide Private Label Websites to their Private Label Affiliates.

Operations

TicketNetwork operates under a model similar to eBay, where tickets are listed on the company's marketplace, but transactions are handled by the individual seller. Buyers are charged a service fee for tickets purchased, plus a delivery fee, depending on the method of delivery, location, and time until the event. Once the tickets are available, the seller ships them directly to the buyer. Sellers are able to list and manage tickets on the marketplace via the TicketNetwork Point of Sale software.

Properties

TicketNetwork operates several retail websites such as TicketNetwork.com and TicketLiquidator.com. It also sponsors an annual trade show called Ticket Summit, which attracts resellers and other ticket industry figures. Additionally, the company operates the Better Ticketing Association, a website containing information and resources for the ticket resale industry. TicketNetwork also sells the tickets uploaded to their marketplace with their Private Label Program which has created controversy.

Green Initiative 
TicketNetwork's campus features several amenities tied to the company's "Green Initiative." A community garden covers substantial acreage of the company headquarters campus in Connecticut. It produces fruit, vegetables, and herbs that are regularly made available for staff to take home, as well as being used in the company cafeteria. There is also an animal sanctuary on the campus, which is home to several llamas, goats, gees, chickens, and pigs as of spring 2020.

In the spring of 2019, construction was completed on a 1.4MW solar system on the roof of the headquarters building. The array, which features 4,365 solar panels, is one of the largest of its kind in Connecticut and produces energy offsetting an estimated 68% of the building's electrical use.

Covid-19 Pandemic Response 
In the wake of the sudden shutdown of live events during the COVID-19 pandemic, TicketNetwork rapidly enacted cost-cutting measures in order to ensure the company's continued operation through the crisis. Customers holding tickets to cancelled events were given the option of vouchers good towards future event purchases, and senior staff members unanimously agreed to a pay cut, allowing the business to avoid large layoffs despite the precipitous drop-off in sales revenue.

Controversies

The ability for any seller to list tickets at any time has resulted in litigation. In 2009 New Jersey's then-Attorney General Anne Milgram filed a lawsuit against several parties, including TicketNetwork, for allegedly selling and advertising tickets before they were available from the venue. The suit was filed by Milgram following reports that primary seller Ticketmaster redirected customers to its TicketsNow website after Bruce Springsteen tickets sold out on Ticketmaster's main website. The case was dismissed in August 2010 after Judge Patricia K. Costello ruled that under federal law TicketNetwork was not liable for incorrect information about the availability of tickets because it was not the seller.

In July 2011 TicketNetwork received a $4.5 million and $1.8 million loan as part of the State of Connecticut's First Five Program, in exchange for hiring at least 200 people over two years time. TicketNetwork also received a $250,000 grant for the training of engineers. TicketNetwork was removed from this program after its then CEO, Don Vaccaro, was arrested in February 2012 following an incident at a local Academy Awards party in Hartford, Connecticut. According to a police report, he had become intoxicated and groped a woman, then when asked to leave by security for the event, made threats to and shouted racial slurs at the bouncer. Shortly after the incident, Vaccaro announced he would be taking an indefinite leave from the company to seek treatment for alcohol abuse. On May 29, 2012, Hartford Superior Court Judge, Jane Alexander, agreed that the charges could be dismissed if Vaccaro completed a two-year accelerated rehabilitation program, a form of probation, imposing conditions such as treatment for substance abuse and abstention from alcohol.

In July 2019, TicketNetwork (along with Ticket Galaxy) reached a $1.55M settlement to resolve a lawsuit with the Attorney General of New York for "misleading tens of thousands of customers into purchasing speculative tickets for concerts and other live events". The lawsuit was prompted by a WNBC investigation in October 2018 into issues with sales of Broadway tickets.

See also

Ticket resale

References

https://www.consumeraffairs.com/entertainment/ticketnetwork.html

External links

Ticket sales companies
Online retailers of the United States
Internet properties established in 2002
Companies based in Hartford County, Connecticut